The Diaz Wind Power Station, is a  power plant under construction in Namibia. The power station is under development and is owned by Diaz Wind Power, a joint venture company owned by (a) United Africa Group and (b) Quantum Power. The energy generated at this wind farm will be sold to NamPower, the national electricity parastatal company of Namibia, under a 25-year power purchase agreement (PPA).

Location
The power station is located near the town of Lüderitz, in the Karas Region of Namibia. Lüderitz is a harbor town in southwest Namibia, along the coast of the Atlantic Ocean.

Overview
This renewable energy project is under development under a public private partnership (PPP) arrangement. The IPP named Diaz Wind Power Pty, has rented land from the government of Namibia, where it is developing this power station.

The project involves the construction of the wind farm and related transmission infrastructure. A 132kV substation will be constructed at the power station. A new 132kV transmission line will evacuate the power generated to a NamPower substation in Namib, from the Diaz Wind farm. The NamPower substations at Namib and Kokerboom, will be upgraded to facilitate integration of the energy into the Namibian grid.

Developers
The table below illustrates the shareholding in the ad hoc company Diaz Wind Power Pty formed to own, build, finance, operate and maintain this power station.

Other considerations
Detailed grid evaluation performed before construction started, indicates that the connecting grid infrastructure can evacuate up to 90 MW. It is expected that Diaz Wind Power Station will be expanded to 90 megawatts capacity in the future.

See also

 List of power stations in Namibia

References

External links
 NamPower signs N$1.5 billion, 25-yr deal with Diaz Wind Power As of 24 January 2018.

Power stations in Namibia
Energy infrastructure in Namibia
Buildings and structures in ǁKaras Region
Lüderitz